Love Enhanced Single Collection (stylized as LOVE ENHANCED ♥ single collection) is the second greatest hits album by Japanese singer Namie Amuro under the Avex Trax label. The album covers 11 of the 12 singles she released after returning from a one-year maternity leave in 1998. The album excludes the single "Toi et Moi" which can only be found on its retailed single. The single was also excluded from her Genius 2000 album.

Overview
Amuro's second compilation is different from her first in that the majority of the album features new versions of previous singles. The only song that wasn't reworked is the track "Lovin' It (Namie Amuro & Verbal)." The initial track list of the album included the song "Put 'Em Up feat. Chili from TLC". However, the song was scrapped from the album and was ultimately released as its own single in 2003. "HimAWArI" is the only song on the album to be included that was not a single. Amuro explained that during the original recording of the song for the "Break the Rules" album she was sick. She wanted to record a new version since it had become a fan favorite.

The album was only moderately successful and she ultimately decided not to tour in support of it that year. This album also contains the last of the work she created with Tetsuya Komuro; the producer who wrote all her previous material. "Love Enhanced" in itself is a turning point for Amuro. After this album she retooled her image, took creative control of her career and made strides to be accepted as an R&B vocalist.

On 28 January 2004, a DVD-Audio version of the album was released.

The album was certified platinum by the RIAJ in 2002.

Track listing
 "Say the Word" (Namie Amuro, Ronald Malmberg, Thomas Johansson) - 3:54
 "Respect the Power of Love" (Tetsuya Komuro) - 5:13
 "Never End" (Tetsuya Komuro) - 6:07
 "Love 2000" (Tetsuya Komuro, Sheila E., Lynn Mabry, Takahiro Maeda) - 5:04
 "Please Smile Again" (Tetsuya Komuro) - 4:44
 "Think of Me" (Dallas Austin, Junko Kudo) - 4:26
 "Something 'bout the Kiss" (Dallas Austin, Lysette Titi, Chang Hai, Jasper Cameron) - 4:45
 "Lovin' It (Namie Amuro & Verbal)" (Tetsuya Komuro, Verbal) - 5:01
 "I Have Never Seen" (Tetsuya Komuro) - 5:37
 "HimAWArI" (Tetsuya Komuro) - 4:46
 "No More Tears" (Tetsuya Komuro) - 5:48
 "I Will" (Namie Amuro, Hiroaki Hayama) - 6:41

Personnel
Performers and musicians

 Namie Amuro – vocals, background vocals
 Verbal – vocals
 Terry Bradford – background vocals
 Andy Caine – background vocals
 Jennifer Carr – background vocals
 Sheila E. – background vocals, percussion, drums
 Debra Killings – background vocals
 Ken Kimura – guitar
 Tetsuya Komuro – acoustic piano, keyboard, synthesizer
 Lynn Mabry – background vocals
 Maruyama Strings Group – strings
 Kazuhiro Matsuo – acoustic guitar
 Renato Neto – keyboard
 Juliet Roberts – background vocals
 Michael Thompson – guitar
 Will Wheaton Jr. – background vocals

Technical

Producers - Dallas Austin, Tetsuya Komuro, Ronald Melmberg, Thomas Johansson
Vocal Direction - Yuko Kawai, Kenji Sano
Remixing - Kevin "KD" Davis, Eddie Delena, Dave Ford, Jon Gass, Eiji Isomura, Manny Maloquin, Chris Puram
Midi & Sound Design - Rick Sheppard
Photography - Shoji Uchida
Art Direction: TYG

Charts
Album - Oricon Sales Chart (Japan)

Singles - Oricon Sales Chart (Japan)

References 

Namie Amuro compilation albums
Albums produced by Dallas Austin
2002 compilation albums
Avex Group compilation albums